The 2022 Copa do Nordeste qualification (officially the Eliminatórias Copa do Nordeste 2022) was the qualifying tournament of the 2022 Copa do Nordeste. It was played from 12 October to 18 November 2021. Twenty-four teams competed to decide four places in the Copa do Nordeste.

Format changes
The tournament was renamed from Pré-Copa do Nordeste to Eliminatórias Copa do Nordeste. Starting from this season, the following format changes were implemented:
The tournament was expanded from eight to twenty-four teams. The teams either qualified by participating in their respective state championships or by the 2021 CBF ranking.

The teams competed in three rounds where the four winners advanced to the Copa do Nordeste (initially 8 teams would compete in one round).

Qualified teams
The three best placed federations in the 2021 CBF state ranking (Ceará, Bahia, and Pernambuco) earned three berths in the tournament, while the remaining six federations earned two. Additionally, it also qualified the three best placed teams in the CBF 2021 ranking not already qualified regardless of the federation.

Schedule
The schedule of the competition was as follows.

Draw
The draw for the group stage was held on 2 September 2021, 12:00, at the CBF headquarters in Rio de Janeiro. The teams were seeded by their 2021 CBF ranking (shown in parentheses) and divided in four pots.  

For the first round, the sixteen teams from the Pots I and II were drawn into eight ties, with the teams from the Pot I hosting the leg. For the second round, the eight teams from the Pots III A and III B were drawn into eight ties, while the eight winners of the first round were allocated without any draw into the ties. For the third round, the eight winners of the second round were allocated without any draw into the following four ties, with the team in each tie with the higher CBF ranking hosting the second leg. Teams from the Pot III A could not be drawn into the same tie.

Competition format
The teams played a single-elimination tournament with the following rules:
The first and second rounds were played on a single-leg basis, with the higher-seeded team hosting the leg.
 If tied, the penalty shoot-out would be used to determine the winners.
The third round was played on a home-and-away two-legged basis, with the higher-seeded team hosting the second leg.
 If tied on aggregate, the penalty shoot-out would be used to determine the winners.
Extra time would not be played and away goals rule would not be used during the tournament.

First round

|}

Second round

|}

Third round

|}

2022 Copa do Nordeste qualified teams
The following four teams qualified for the 2022 Copa do Nordeste.

Top goalscorers

References

Copa do Nordeste
2021 in Brazilian football